The Nationalist Liberal Party (PLN) was a political party in Nicaragua.

When Anastasio Somoza García took power in 1936, the party aligned itself with the United States and other caudillos in Latin America, like Rafael Trujillo, Oswaldo López Arellano and Fulgencio Batista.

From 1936 to 1979, the office of President of Nicaragua was held by members of the Nationalist Liberal Party. When the first phase of the Nicaraguan Revolution was won by the FSLN, the PLN was dissolved by the new government.  Many Somoza loyalists later supported or joined Contras rebel groups.

History of the party

Whilst initially it still featured a liberal agenda (the Liberals having been one of the two main parties of Nicaragua since the 19th century along with the Conservatives), the Nationalist Liberal Party later developed into little more than a political vehicle for the kleptocracy of the Somoza clan.

The party suffered several splits: in 1944, opposing Anastasio Somoza García's intentions to re-run for the presidency, dissident party members such as Manuel Cordero Reyes, Roberto González Dubón, Carlos Morales, Gerónimo Ramírez Brown (minister of public education from 1939 to 1944) and Carlos Pasos formed the new Independent Liberal Party, that functioned for decades to come as a legal, centrist opposition party and briefly sided with the Sandinistas to overthrow Somoza Debayle and cement the victory of the Nicaraguan Revolution. In 1968, another group of members, led by Ramiro Sacasa Guerrero (former minister for labor), split from the Nationalist Liberal Party, disagreeing with Anastasio Somoza Debayle's ambition to re-run. They formed the Constitutionalist Liberal Movement, which later evolved into the Constitutionalist Liberal Party.

The party was banned after the FSLN takeover in 1979.

Notable members
 José María Moncada
 Juan Bautista Sacasa
 Anastasio Somoza García
 Luis Somoza Debayle
 Anastasio Somoza Debayle
 Leonardo Argüello Barreto
 Benjamín Lacayo Sacasa
 Víctor Manuel Román y Reyes
 René Schick
 Orlando Montenegro Medrano
 Francisco Urcuyo
 Lorenzo Guerrero

Electoral history

Presidential elections

National Assembly elections

See also 
Nicaraguan Revolution
Somoza family
Contras

References 

1936 establishments in Nicaragua
1979 disestablishments in Nicaragua
Banned political parties
Conservative parties in Nicaragua
Defunct political parties in Nicaragua
Nationalist parties in North America
Organizations of the Nicaraguan Revolution
Political parties disestablished in 1979
Political parties established in 1936